Metal Gear Solid: The Twin Snakes is a 2004 action-adventure stealth video game developed by Konami and Silicon Knights and published by Konami for the GameCube. Released in March, the game is a remake of Metal Gear Solid, originally developed by Konami Computer Entertainment Japan for the PlayStation in 1998.

The Twin Snakes features graphical improvements over the original, new cutscenes written and directed by Ryuhei Kitamura, and gameplay functions originally introduced in the sequel Metal Gear Solid 2: Sons of Liberty. The game includes a revised translation with re-recorded voice acting, using almost all of the original English voice cast. The game was met with positive reception.

Gameplay

The gameplay of  The Twin Snakes was altered to resemble that of Metal Gear Solid 2: Sons of Liberty. While all of the original areas and enemies were kept, new ways for the player to combat them were introduced, such as the ability to shoot from a first-person view. Enemy AI was improved, giving enemy soldiers the ability to communicate with each other and detect the player more intelligently with senses of sight and sound enhanced.

Development
The Twin Snakes was first announced in 2003 by Nintendo of America, confirming that Silicon Knights would be developing under the guidance of Metal Gear creator Hideo Kojima and Mario creator Shigeru Miyamoto. Kojima was busy working on Metal Gear Solid 3: Snake Eater at the time, and was unable to commit to the project full-time. He later suggested to both Miyamoto and Satoru Iwata to let Silicon Knights take the helm as he was a fan of their work. The company's CEO Denis Dyack, who had recently completed Eternal Darkness: Sanity's Requiem, happened to be at the Nintendo cafeteria in Japan when he was approached by both Miyamoto and Iwata to work on The Twin Snakes, to which he agreed.

Although The Twin Snakes was largely developed at Silicon Knights, Ryuhei Kitamura directed many of the game's cinematics while Silicon Knights implemented them into the game to look identical to those in the original Metal Gear Solid, but upon inspection Hideo Kojima asked Kitamura to redo them in his well-known action style. The reworked cinematics did receive some criticism due to Kitamura's excessive use of the bullet time effect, which was largely inspired by the then popular hit movie The Matrix. The game's composition duties were split: some of the in-game music was handled by Steve Henifin and Silicon Knights' music staff, while the rest of the music (in-game, menus and cut scenes) was handled by Konami's music staff, including Metal Gear Solid 2 co-composer Norihiko Hibino.

Plot

Voice acting
The voice acting was re-recorded with the original cast from Metal Gear Solid, except for the role of the Cyborg Ninja. David Hayter, the English voice of Solid Snake, persuaded Konami Computer Entertainment Japan to have the original voice cast reprise their roles. The main reason for the re-recording, according to an interview with Hayter, was because the increased audio quality allowed by the GameCube picked up outside noise from the original recordings that were inaudible in the PlayStation version. In the original game, Gray Fox and Donald Anderson were both voiced by Greg Eagles. However, in The Twin Snakes, Greg Eagles voices only Anderson, whereas Gray Fox was voiced by Rob Paulsen. The revised voice acting is used in Metal Gear Solid 4 during Snake's reminiscence as the English-language voice-recording used in the original game was not recorded in a sound-proof studio. Mei Ling, Nastasha Romanenko, and Naomi Hunter speak with American accents in The Twin Snakes, whereas in the original Metal Gear Solid, they spoke with Chinese, Ukrainian, and British accents, respectively.

Release
The Twin Snakes was released on March 9, 2004 in North America. It was originally to be released in November 2003, but was pushed back, along with the other versions. The European date was pushed back several weeks.

In Japan The Twin Snakes was released on March 11 alongside an exclusive Premium Package. The box includes the game itself; a platinum-colored GameCube adorned with the FOXHOUND logo; a 44-page book titled Memorandum containing production notes, sketches and photos; and a GameCube disc called the "Special Disc" containing an emulated version of the Family Computer version of the original Metal Gear.

Reception

Much like the original Metal Gear Solid was met with positive reviews from critics, The Twin Snakes received an 85.58% and 85/100 from GameRankings and Metacritic, respectively. IGN gave The Twin Snakes 8.5 out of 10, praising its superior graphics and likening the presentation to epic movies. GameSpot gave it an 8.2 out of 10 or "Great" on their scale, Eurogamer rated The Twin Snakes as 8 out of 10 and Gaming Age gave it an "A−" rating. Game Informer gave The Twin Snakes a 9.25 out of 10, citing its improved gameplay and graphics, and also its faithful retelling of the original Metal Gear Solid story.  The publication later placed The Twin Snakes at #11 on their list of "Top 25 GameCube Games" in 2009. Official Nintendo Magazine placed the game 80th on their list of the Top 100 Best Nintendo games.

Despite receiving generally favorable reviews, The Twin Snakes has also drawn criticism. According to GamePro, the game has a "flagging framerate and bouts of slowdown that occur when too much activity crowds the screen." The use of new gameplay elements from Sons of Liberty was seen as unnecessary, as GamePro thought that the level design was virtually unchanged from Metal Gear Solid, which "spoils the challenge... and completely ruins one boss battle (Revolver Ocelot)."

References

Notes

Footnotes

External links

2004 video games
Action-adventure games
GameCube games
Konami games
GameCube-only games
Metal Gear video games
Silicon Knights games
Single-player video games
Stealth video games
Video game remakes
Video games designed by Hideo Kojima
Video games developed in Canada
Video games set in Alaska
Video games set in the United States
Video games set on fictional islands
Video games produced by Hideo Kojima
Video games scored by Norihiko Hibino
Video games scored by Steve Henifin
Video games scored by Toshiyuki Kakufa
Video games scored by Shuichi Kobori
Video games scored by Waichiro Ozaki
Video games developed in Japan